Diamond Valley is a valley in northern Washington County, Utah, United States, that is located about  north of the northern limits of St. George on Utah State Route 18, just past the entrance to Snow Canyon State Park at an elevation of approximately 4500 ft, 1800 ft higher than the neighboring metropolis of St George. Meaning if the Empire State Building was moved to downtown St George, Diamond Valley would still be higher than the tip of that structure. The unincorporated community of Diamond Valley is located within the valley, as is the Santa Clara Volcano.

See also
 List of valleys of Utah

References

External links

Washington County, Utah
Valleys of Utah